Lasius murphyi is a species of ant in the genus Lasius. It is endemic to the United States and Canada.

References

Further reading
Ant Wiki

murphyi
Insects of the United States
Taxonomy articles created by Polbot
Taxobox binomials not recognized by IUCN
Insects described in 1901